ESND may refer to:

 the ICAO code of Sveg Airport, in Sveg, Sweden.
 the NASDAQ symbol of Essendant Inc.

See also 
 eSND, the Electronic Scottish National Dictionary